Julie Coin was the defending champion, but decided not to participate this year.

Jovana Jakšić won the title, defeating Amra Sadiković 6–3, 6–7(5–7), 6–1 in the final.

Seeds

Draw

Finals

Top half

Bottom half

References
Main Draw

Challenger Banque Nationale de Saguenay
Challenger de Saguenay